The Mexican Football Federation (abbreviated as Femexfut or FMF) is the governing body of association football in Mexico. It administers the Mexico national team, the Liga MX and all affiliated amateur sectors, and controls promoting, organizing, directing, expanding, and supervising competitive football in Mexico.

The Federación has three operational centres: the Central Office, the High Performance Centre (CAR) and the Training Centre (CECAP).

FEMEXFUT is a member of the CONCACAF and FIFA, and is subject to policies, statutes, objectives and ideals of those international play football governing bodies.

The Federación was established on 23 August 1922 under the inaugural president Humberto Garza Ramos. In 1929, FIFA affiliation was established; CONCACAF affiliation was established in 1961.

Structure

The governing body of the Federación is the General Assembly that conforms with the participation of the Liga MX with 55% of the votes; Ascenso MX with 5%; Liga Premier, with 18%; Tercera División, with 13%, and the Amateur sector, with 9%. The executive and administrative body is the National Council, which comprises five members, one from each of the divisions mentioned, and are elected every four years.

Association staff

Competitions
The league is composed of four professional divisions: Liga MX, Liga de Expansión MX, Liga Premier, and Liga TDP. The Liga MX Femenil is the top-tier of women's football in Mexico.

Criticism

Multi-team ownership issue
The issue of multi-team ownership has been a highly debated one within the owners of the professional football clubs and the Femexfut. Of 36 clubs in the top two tiers, about a third of the teams are owned by three groups: Grupo Pachuca (Pachuca, León, Tlaxcala), Grupo Caliente (Tijuana, Dorados de Sinaloa, Querétaro) and Grupo Orlegi (Santos Laguna, Atlas). Of those groups that own more than one team, that ownership is usually split between the top two tiers of the league and act as a form of player development.

In May 2013, the Liga MX club owners approved banning a person or company from owning more than one team. The issue came to fore when rumor was that Carlos Slim, whose telecommunications company América Móvil owns a 30% stake in Grupo Pachuca, sought to acquire Guadalajara; he would refute the speculation. The ban applied to future acquisitions, not the then current team ownership, and did not require the sale of teams in excess of the one team limitation.

The issue reemerged in November 2013 when TV Azteca, owner of Monarcas Morelia, paid out 124 shareholders of Club Atlas US$50 million to acquire the club, which for years had been struggling financially.

2026 World Cup Bid

In September 2012, former Federación President Justino Compeán confirmed plans to bid. On 4 March 2016, Federación President Decio De Maria announced continued interest after the new FIFA president Gianni Infantino was elected in the wake of the Garcia Report corruption scandal. In April 2017, the Federación, with Canada Soccer Association and the United States Soccer Federation, announced a joint bid to host the World Cup. It was awarded on 13 June 2018; 134 votes versus the  Morocco bid by the Royal Moroccan Football Federation with 65 votes. Mexico will host 10 matches,  Canada 3 matches, and the United States 60 matches in 10 cities including the final. The shortlist of match cities was selected in June 2022: Guadalajara, Mexico City, & Monterrey.

Chant Controversy 
Mexican Football fans are known for shouting out "Puto!", when the opposing team's goalkeeper is about to perform a goal kick, a custom that has repeatedly led to FIFA fining the Mexican Federation. In September 2019, the FMF launched a campaign to end the chant during matches, with Federation President Yon De Luisa and Liga MX President Enrique Bonilla announcing new league-wide protocols. The measures will allow officials to stop a match if the homophobic slur is chanted and play an announcement over the stadium loudspeakers as a warning to fans. In case of a second incident during a match, officials will have the option to order the teams back to their changing rooms for a period of 5 to 10 minutes. If the chant continues a third time, the local club will be sanctioned.

The protocols were employed for the first time in the Liga MX on 26 October 2019 during the Apertura match between Atlas and visiting side Necaxa, in which the slur was heard up to six times. Referee Fernando Guerrero eventually ended the match before the completion of the six minutes of stoppage time. The protocols were used for the first time in the playoffs on 27 November, during the first-leg of the series between Club León and Monarcas Morelia.

During the 2021 CONCACAF Nations League Finals, fans chanted out the homophobic chant during both the semifinal against Costa Rica and the final match against the United States. This has led CONCACAF to initiate their anti-discrimination protocol by stopping the match in order to warn fans of getting ejected for saying the chant.

FIFA later announced on 18 June 2021, that the Mexican Football Federation would be fined of up to $65,000 for the behaviour of fans at the 2020 CONCACAF Men's Olympic Qualifying Championship and that two of the 2022 FIFA World Cup qualification matches with Jamaica on 2 September and Canada on 7 October would be held behind closed doors. The FIFA Appeals Committee later cut the punishment in half, allowing fans to attend the Canada match.

See also 
Football in Mexico
Mexico national football team
Mexico women's national football team
 Mexican Football League System

References

External links
 Official website
 Mexico at FIFA website
 Mexico at CONCACAF site

Mexico
Football in Mexico
Football
Organizations based in Mexico City
Sports organizations established in 1927
Association football governing bodies in North America
1927 establishments in Mexico
Sport in Mexico City